George Tutuska (born February 27, 1965) is an American musician, best known as the former drummer of the alternative rock band Goo Goo Dolls.

Life and career
Tutuska is from Buffalo, New York. He is of Irish and Hungarian descent, and he is married with two children.

Goo Goo Dolls

Tutuska played drums with the Goo Goo Dolls from 1985 to 1994.

Departure
Prior to Tutuska's departure from the Goo Goo Dolls, there was a payment dispute between him and long-time friend and singer/guitarist John Rzeznik over Tutuska's contribution to the writing of the Superstar Car Wash single "Fallin' Down". During the completion of A Boy Named Goo, Tutuska had told band management that he would not tour behind the album unless royalties were to be split evenly among the three members, a practice Tutuska said had been the band's standard practice ever since the release of its self-titled debut in 1987. Tutuska has said that when he told Rzeznik he had not received royalties from "Fallin' Down", Rzeznik admitted that he had been receiving such royalties for two years.

Just before A Boy Named Goo's release, Tutuska left the band and was replaced by Mike Malinin.

Post-Goo Goo Dolls
During the 2000s, Tutuska played drums for a local South Buffalo based Celtic Rock band named Jackdaw. The band broke up in 2009.

References

Living people
Musicians from Buffalo, New York
American rock drummers
Goo Goo Dolls members
American people of Polish descent
1965 births
20th-century American drummers
American male drummers